This is a history of the progression of the World Record for the Swimming event: the 50 butterfly. It is a listing of the fastest-time-ever in the event, in both long course (50m) and short course (25m) swimming pool. These records are maintained/recognized by FINA, which oversees international competitive swimming and Aquatics.

The World Records in the 50s of stroke are the youngest Swimming World Records; FINA first recognizing them in the 1990s.

Men

Long course

|-

Short course

Women

Long course

Short course

All-time top 25

Men long course
Correct as of September 2022

Notes
Below is a list of other times equal or superior to 22.96:
Andriy Govorov also swam 22.48 (2018), 22.53 (2018), 22.69 (2016, 2018), 22.73 (2016, 2018), 22.77 (2017, 2018), 22.80 (2019), 22.81 (2016), 22.82 (2018), 22.84 (2017, 2019), 22.85 (2018), 22.87 (2014, 2018, 2019), 22.89 (2018), 22.90 (2017, 2018), 22.91 (2019), 22.92 (2016, 2017), 22.94 (2016).
Caeleb Dressel also swam 22.57 (2019, 2022), 22.76 (2017), 22.79 (2022), 22.83 (2019), 22.84 (2019, 2022), 22.88 (2022), 22.89 (2017).
Nicholas Santos also swam 22.61 (2017), 22.73 (2022), 22.77 (2019, 2019), 22.78 (2022), 22.79 (2012, 2017, 2019), 22.80 (2017), 22.81 (2013), 22.83 (2022), 22.84 (2017), 22.90 (2015), 22.94 (2019), 22.95 (2013, 2017, 2020).
Rafael Muñoz also swam 22.68 (2009), 22.88 (2009), 22.90 (2009).
Milorad Čavić also swam 22.69 (2009), 22.75 (2009), 22.83 (2009), 22.93 (2009).
Oleg Kostin also swam 22.72 (2022), 22.74 (2019), 22.82 (2020), 22.88 (2019).
Ben Proud also swam 22.76 (2022), 22.78 (2018), 22.80 (2017), 22.81 (2022), 22.92 (2017), 22.93 (2014, 2018), 22.96 (2018).
Michael Andrew also swam 22.80 (2019), 22.87 (2022), 22.89 (2022), 22.90 (2022), 22.93 (2018), 22.94 (2019), 22.95 (2019).
Thomas Ceccon also swam 22.86 (2022), 22.88 (2022), 22.89 (2022).
Dylan Carter also swam 22.87 (2022).
Nyls Korstanje also swam 22.90 (2022).
César Cielo also swam 22.91 (2014).
Szebasztián Szabó also swam 22.91 (2022), 22.93 (2019), 22.96 (2020).
Frédérick Bousquet also swam 22.93 (2013).
Joseph Schooling also swam 22.95 (2017).
Roland Schoeman also swam 22.96 (2005).

Men short course
Correct as of December 2022

Notes
Below is a list of other times equal or superior to 22.25:
Nicholas Santos also swam 21.78 (2020, 2022), 21.80 (2021), 21.93 (2021), 21.98 (2021), 22.08 (2022), 22.09 (2021), 22.12 (2021).
Szebasztián Szabó also swam 21.86 (2020), 21.90 (2022), 21.97 (2021), 21.98 (2022), 22.00 (2021), 22.07 (2022), 22.11 (2021), 22.14 (2021), 22.22 (2021).
Chad Le Clos also swam 21.98 (2016), 22.09 (2022), 22.11 (2022).
Dylan Carter also swam 21.99 (2022), 22.02 (2022), 22.11 (2022), 22.14 (2022), 22.18 (2021), 22.25 (2021).
Noè Ponti also swam 22.01 (2022), 22.04 (2022).
Tom Shields also swam 22.09 (2021), 22.19 (2021), 22.22 (2021).
Oleg Kostin also swam 22.10 (2021).
Matteo Rivolta also swam 22.14 (2021), 22.20 (2021).
Marius Kusch also swam 22.17 (2022), 22.19 (2022).
Teong Tzen Wei also swam 22.18 (2022), 22.24 (2021).
Thomas Ceccon also swam 22.24 (2021).

Women long course
Correct as of August 2022

Notes
Below is a list of other times equal or superior to 25.56:
Sarah Sjöström also swam 24.60 (2017), 24.69 (2015), 24.76 (2017), 24.79 (2019), 24.87 (2014), 24.90 (2017), 24.95 (2017, 2022), 24.96 (2015, 2017, 2022), 24.98 (2014), 24.99 (2016), 25.02 (2017, 2019), 25.05 (2022), 25.06 (2015), 25.07 (2015, 2016, 2018), 25.10 (2022), 25.11 (2018, 2018), 25.12 (2014, 2020), 25.13 (2022), 25.14 (2018), 25.15 (2016, 2017), 25.16 (2018), 25.18 (2016), 25.19 (2018), 25.21 (2022), 25.22 (2018), 25.23 (2014, 2015), 25.24 (2016), 25.25 (2017, 2023), 25.26 (2017, 2022), 25.27 (2016), 25.30 (2015, 2017, 2022), 25.32 (2019), 25.33 (2018), 25.34 (2019), 25.35 (2015, 2017), 25.37 (2016), 25.39 (2018, 2019), 25.41 (2015), 25.42 (2016, 2021), 25.43 (2015, 2018, 2022), 25.46 (2022), 25.48 (2019), 25.51 (2017, 2018), 25.52 (2014), 25.53 (2018), 25.55 (2016, 2019).
Mélanie Henique also swam 25.24 (2020), 25.30 (2021), 25.31 (2022), 25.41 (2022), 25.46 (2021), 25.52 (2020), 25.53 (2021).
Rikako Ikee also swam 25.25 (2018), 25.32 (2018), 25.46 (2017), 25.49 (2022), 25.53 (2018), 25.55 (2018), 25.56 (2021).
Jeanette Ottesen also swam 25.27 (2014, 2015), 25.29 (2012), 25.34 (2014, 2015), 25.41 (2014), 25.43 (2014), 25.44 (2016), 25.48 (2015), 25.49 (2014), 25.50 (2013, 2016), 25.51 (2015, 2015, 2015), 25.53 (2015), 25.56 (2013).
Ranomi Kromowidjojo also swam 25.30 (2021), 25.32 (2020), 25.35 (2019), 25.36 (2021), 25.38 (2017, 2020), 25.43 (2021), 25.53 (2013), 25.54 (2019), 25.57 (2017, 2019, 2022).
Marleen Veldhuis also swam 25.33 (2009).
Fran Halsall also swam 25.35 (2016), 25.36 (2014), 25.39 (2014), 25.48 (2016).
Farida Osman also swam 25.39 (2017), 25.46 (2022), 25.47 (2019), 25.48 (2018).
Zhang Yufei also swam 25.39 (2022), 25.54 (2022).
Lu Ying also swam 25.42 (2013).
Therese Alshammar also swam 25.44 (2009), 25.46 (2007), 25.50 (2010), 25.52 (2011).
Torri Huske also swam 25.45 (2022).
Cate Campbell also swam 25.49 (2019), 25.51 (2018), 25.56 (2018).
Claire Curzan also swam 25.49 (2022).
Marie Wattel also swam 25.50 (2019), 25.51 (2021), 25.56 (2019, 2022).
Inge Dekker also swam 25.55 (2014).

Women short course
Correct as of December 2022

Notes
Below is a list of other times equal or superior to 25.09:
Therese Alshammar also swam 24.46 (2009), 24.75 (2009).
Ranomi Kromowidjojo also swam 24.47 (2018), 24.61 (2021), 24.74 (2021), 24.97 (2021).
Sarah Sjöström also swam 24.51 (2021), 24.52 (2017), 24.92 (2021), 24.94 (2021).
Maggie MacNeil also swam 24.75 (2022), 24.78 (2022).
Zhang Yufei also swam 24.75 (2022), 24.79 (2022), 24.91 (2021), 24.97 (2021).
Holly Barratt also swam 24.77 (2021), 24.80 (2018), 25.06 (2021).
Beryl Gastaldello also swam 24.85 (2022), 25.06 (2022).
Torri Huske also swam 24.86 (2022), 24.88 (2021).
Arina Surkova also swam 24.87 (2020).
Melanie Henique also swam 24.88 (2022), 24.91 (2022), 24.92 (2022), 25.02 (2018).
Claire Curzan also swam 24.92 (2022), 24.96 (2022).
Kelsi Dahlia also swam 24.93 (2018).
Maaike de Waard also swam 24.94 (2020), 24.97 (2021), 24.98 (2022).
Emma McKeon also swam 24.97 (2021), 25.07 (2021), 25.10 (2021).
Marieke Guehrer also swam 24.99 (2008).

References

  Zwemkroniek
  Agenda Diana

Butterfly 050 metres
World record progression 050 metres butterfly